Nantyglo railway station was a station which served Nantyglo, in the Welsh county of Monmouthshire.

History
The line was converted to a railway in 1855 together with other Monmouth tramroads in the area. It became part of the Great Western Railway in 1880 and remained there at the Grouping of 1923.

Although the Monmouthshire Railway had established a goods station at Brynmawr by 15 December 1849 via its connection with Joseph and Crawshay Bailey's tramroad at Coalbrook Vale, passenger services were not extended beyond Nantyglo Gate at Blaina. It was only after agreement was reached in June 1858 with the two brothers that the Monmouthshire Railway was authorised to establish a station in their territory. Although the official opening took place on 30 June 1905, it was not until 28 May 1906 that it was authorised to open. The new line, which was on a 1 in 47 gradient fall towards Nantyglo, was jointly worked by the Great Western and the LNWR, with traffic exchanged between the two companies at Nantyglo.

A single platform was provided for the station which had a small goods yard on the opposite side of the line. Such was the traffic generated during the 1930s that the station had a staff of eleven. To the north of the station was a tall signal box with 20 levers and to the south there was a passing loop. Passenger and goods services were withdrawn from the station on 30 April 1962. The line was progressively shortened as colleries were closed, with official closure of the section between Brynmawr and Coalbrookvale including Nantyglo coming on 4 November 1963. The last section of the route near Abertillery was taken out of use in 1989 after the closure of Six Bells Colliery.

Present
The A467 road follows the course of the former line through Nantyglo.

References

Notes

Sources

Disused railway stations in Blaenau Gwent
Former Great Western Railway stations
Railway stations in Great Britain opened in 1859
Railway stations in Great Britain closed in 1962
1859 establishments in Wales
1963 disestablishments in Wales